Rhododendron spiciferum (碎米花) is a rhododendron species native to western Guizhou and Yunnan, China, where it grows at altitudes of . The flowers are pink or rarely white.

References
 "Rhododendron spiciferum", Franchet, J. Bot. (Morot). 9: 400. 1895.

spiciferum